Baby Jet Airlines Limited was a proposed airline, founded by professional footballer Asamoah Gyan. The company was founded in 2017 and its launch was officially announced by the President of Ghana, Nana Addo Dankwah Akufo-Addo in October 2017. It was awarded an Air Carriers Licence by the Ghana Civil Aviation Authority, but did not commence operations despite multiple announced start dates.

References 

Proposed airlines
Ghanaian companies established in 2017
Defunct airlines of Ghana
Airlines established in 2017
Airlines disestablished in 2019
2010s disestablishments in Ghana